Vangede station is a station on the Farum radial of the S-train network in Copenhagen, Denmark. It is located in the Vangede district of Gentofte Municipality.

History

Vangede Station was not one of the original stations of the Slangerup Line. It was created in 1906 and the first station building was a red brick building designed by Heinrich Wenck. It was demolished shortly after a new station building opened in 1968 in connection with the preparation of electrification and conversion of the railway into an S-train line.

In popular culture
The station is used as a location in the films Sønnen fra Amerika (1957) and Landsbylægen (1961).

References

External links

Railway stations opened in 1906
1906 establishments in Denmark
S-train (Copenhagen) stations
Railway stations in Denmark opened in the 20th century